The 2011 Deutsche Tourenwagen Masters season was a multi-event motor racing series largely based in Germany for highly modified touring car racing cars and is one of the most popular sedan car-based motor racing series in the world. The series features professional racing teams and drivers and is heavily supported by car manufacturers Audi and Mercedes-Benz. Each race features 18 V8-powered racing cars built according to the technical regulations of the Deutsche Tourenwagen Masters. It was the twenty-fifth season of premier German touring car championship and also twelfth season under the moniker of Deutsche Tourenwagen Masters since the series' resumption in 2000. It was the final season running the 4-door saloon-style spec cars, which has been the series' sole car style requirements since 2005 (although 4-door saloon-style spec cars were introduced majorly in 2004 but few coupé cars were also featured due to cost reasons). It was also the final season that all DTM cars ran with the sequential manual gearbox shifters before all DTM cars switched to sequential semi-automatic paddle-shifters for the following season.

Canadian Mercedes-Benz driver Bruno Spengler led the series after five races. After winning the season-opening Hockenheim and the most recent race at the Norisring, Spengler held a three-point lead over German Audi driver Martin Tomczyk who won races at the Red Bull Ring and Lausitzring. The two held a points gap over third-placed Audi driver Timo Scheider. The other race winner was Audi driver Mike Rockenfeller, although after his Le Mans sportscar accident Rockenfeller had to take a break from DTM to recover with series veteran Tom Kristensen replacing him.

Series news
Previous sole tyre supplier Dunlop announced on 19 November 2010 that it would not renew its contract with Deutsche Tourenwagen Masters after 2010 season, with Hankook Tire was chosen as the sole tyre supplier for 2011-2013 seasons by the DMSB, ITR e.V. and FIA as it was announced on 17 January 2011 and thus carrying the Hankook Ventus brand. The front and rear tyre sizes of Hankook Ventus DTM tyres for 2011 season would almost remained same sizes as previous Dunlop SP Sport Maxx DTM tyres but the front tyre width slightly reduced (260/660-R18 (10.2/25.9-R18) on fronts and 280/660-R18 (11.0/25.9-R18) on rears).

 The development freeze introduced for the 2010 season remains in place for the 2011 season.

Teams and drivers
The following manufacturers, teams and drivers competed in the 2011 Deutsche Tourenwagen Masters. All teams competed with tyres supplied by Hankook.

Driver changes
Changed teams
Mike Rockenfeller moved into the factory Team Abt Sportsline outfit, driving a latest-specification car for the first time. He replaced Martin Tomczyk who filled Rockenfeller's vacant drive at Team Phoenix. With Paul di Resta leaving the HWA Team for Force India in Formula One, Jamie Green took over his spot in a latest-specification Mercedes.

Entering DTM
Team Rosberg had two new drivers for the 2011 season, with reigning Formula 3 Euro Series champion Edoardo Mortara and Race of Champions winner Filipe Albuquerque driving. Rahel Frey competed for Team Phoenix after selected drives in various series in 2010. Single-seater racers Christian Vietoris and Renger van der Zande both competed for Persson Motorsport; van der Zande moving from GP3, while Vietoris combining his DTM programme with a season in GP2.

Leaving DTM
Reigning champion Paul di Resta did not defend his title with the HWA Team, having moved into a Formula One drive with Force India. Audi driver Markus Winkelhock moved into the FIA GT1 World Championship with Münnich Motorsport, while fellow Audi drivers Alexandre Prémat and Katherine Legge lost their drives in the series.

Race calendar and results
The series hosted its first stadium event in July for a round at Munich's Olympic Stadium. The event did not count for points but the entire grid took part over two days. A twelve-race provisional calendar was announced on 29 September, including the non-championship event in Munich, and a return to the newly renamed Red Bull Ring, replacing Adria. The calendar was reduced to eleven races on 1 April, after the race in Shanghai was dropped. The Chinese motorsport authorities did not want an event clash with the inaugural Chinese round of the World Touring Car Championship due to be held on the same day at the Guangdong International Circuit.

Championship standings

Drivers' Championship

† — Driver retired, but was classified as they completed 90% of the winner's race distance.

Teams' Championship

Notable events
The celebrations on the podium at final DTM race at Hockenheimring were muted due to the death of 2005, 2011 Indy 500 and 2005 IndyCar Series champion Dan Wheldon who was killed in a fiery 15-car crash at Sunday's season-ending IndyCar race in Las Vegas. Jamie Green won that finale DTM race as Green pays tribute to his compatriot a week after Las Vegas Indy tragedy.

Footnotes

References

External links
 The official website of the Deutsche Tourenwagen Masters (English)

Deutsche Tourenwagen Masters seasons
Deutsche Tourenwagen Masters